Roman Jurko (born 25 January 1983 in Košice) is a Slovak former professional footballer who played as striker and currently is manager for the 4. liga club FK Čaňa.

Honours

Slovakia
Slovakia U19
 2002 UEFA European Under-19 Football Championship - Third place

External links
at fkmoldava.sk

References

1983 births
Living people
Slovak footballers
Slovak expatriate sportspeople in Spain
Association football forwards
FC VSS Košice players
ŠK Slovan Bratislava players
FK Inter Bratislava players
FC DAC 1904 Dunajská Streda players
Hapoel Ra'anana A.F.C. players
FK Bodva Moldava nad Bodvou players
Partizán Bardejov players
FC Lokomotíva Košice players
UD Alzira footballers
Slovak Super Liga players
Expatriate footballers in Israel
Expatriate footballers in Spain
Sportspeople from Košice
Slovak expatriate footballers
Slovak expatriate sportspeople in Israel